Victor Cook (born c. 1960/1961) is an American television producer and director best known for his work on the animated series The Spectacular Spider-Man (2008–2009), Scooby-Doo! Mystery Incorporated (2010–2013) and Stretch Armstrong and the Flex Fighters (2017–2018), and as an executive producer of Disney Junior's T.O.T.S.

Early life
Cook was born in the early 1960s, one of five children on the Johnson Air Force Base in Saitama, Japan His parents met in an Air Force cafeteria while his father was enlisted. He is half-Korean through his mother. After leaving Saitama, the family lived in San Antonio, Texas; Florida; Forth Worth, Texas; Euless, Texas; Okinawa, Japan (at Kadena Air Base); and Atwater, California. After high school, he briefly attended a junior college in Central California before transferring to California State University, Long Beach.

As a child and into college, his goal was to be a print cartoonist, but was dissuaded after reading about Jack Kirby's career.  While at the junior college, a life drawing teacher gave him the contact information for a former student who went on to work for Hanna-Barbera. He only called once he was already into his career. The student suggested taking an animation class at The Animation Guild.

Career
After graduating college, Cook worked as a graphic artist and political cartoonist for Costa Mesa's Daily Pilot then as an assistant animator at Filmation. At Filmation, he found himself drawn to storyboards because they reminded him of comic cels. He worked on BraveStarr during the day and took storyboard classes at night until Filmation folded. He was able to find a job working on ALF Tales and ALF: The Animated Series. This experience helped him eventually land at Disney Television Animation, where he worked for 16 years. After leaving Disney, he worked with Greg Weisman to create The Spectacular Spider-Man; worked on Scooby-Doo! Mystery Incorporated; and started at Hasbro, where he helped develop Stretch Armstrong and the Flex Fighters alongside writer Kevin Burke and producer Chris "Doc" Wyatt. In the late 2010s, he was hired onto T.O.T.S. by Disney Junior.

He is the creator of the Mecha-Nation comic books. It is the first comic book he's worked on.

The Spectacular Spider-Man 

Cook was called by Sony Entertainment to develop a DVD project about Spider-Man. Cook developed it with Greg Weisman; they wanted to base it on the early comic book publications of the character that showed him younger, which Cook had never seen done before in any adaption. The idea was reformatted to an animated television series, but maintained a similar chronicle style where, as Cook describes, "each episode stands alone as its own story, but like the comic book itself it's a saga. Then each three episodes is a story and those three episodes are what would be on the DVD releases." The original title for the series was The Amazing Spider-Man, based on the comic series of the same name, but by mid-2007 the name was changed to The Spectacular Spider-Man.

Cook wanted the animation to be squash and stretch style, and the action to be as good as the first two live action movies Sam Raimi directed as they had "set the bar" for the fluid movement for Spider-Man. As they were on a specific budget, they wanted to allow the animation to "move" more than anything, giving it simple and stylistic designs. He also looked back on Blood and Iron which had a "fresh, young, look to it" that appealed to him visually. Cook wanted to make an "iconic" Spider-Man for both new and older generations and "really wanted this to be a two dimensional Spider-man that moved like we've never really seen him move in animation before." The Spectacular Spider-Man became very successful in its first season on Kids WB! and entered its second season in the US in 2009 on Disney XD.

Personal life
He and his wife Sonia, who is also half-Korean, have been married since the late 1980s. They have two children: Hanah and Jackson. His daughter is an animation writer. and, according to Victor's friend and colleague Greg Weisman, served as the inspiration for Artemis Crock in Young Justice.

As an animator, Cook admires Charles M. Schulz, Jack Kirby and Hayao Miyazaki, and was a Hanna-Barbera fan growing up.

Filmography

Television
{| class="wikitable sortable"
! rowspan="2" |Year
! rowspan="2" |Title
! colspan="4" |Credited as
! rowspan="2" |Notes
! rowspan="2" |
|-
! Director !! Producer !! Art !! Writer 
|-
| 1987—1988 || BraveStarr ||  ||  ||  ||  || || 
|-
| 1988 || ALF Tales ||  ||  ||  ||  || ||
|-
| 1988—1989 || ALF: The Animated Series ||  ||  ||  ||  || ||
|-
| rowspan="4" | 1989 || The Smurfs ||  ||  ||  ||  || ||
|-
| The Karate Kid ||  ||  ||  ||  || ||
|-
| Garfield and Friends ||  ||  ||  ||  || ||
|-
| Denver, the Last Dinosaur ||  ||  ||  ||  || ||
|-
| 1990 || TaleSpin ||  ||  ||  ||  || Episode "Time Waits for No Bear" ||
|-
| 1991 || Widget ||  ||  ||  ||  || ||
|-
| rowspan="2" | 1992 || The Little Mermaid ||  ||  ||  ||  || Episode "Urchin" ||
|-
| Raw Toonage ||  ||  ||  || || Episodes "Bonkers in Space/Cro-Magnum PI/The Treasure of the Sierra Marsdre" and "Sheerluck Bonkers/All Potato Network/The Puck Stops Here" ||
|-
| rowspan="2" | 1991—1992 || Darkwing Duck ||  ||  ||  ||  || Wrote "Kung Fooled" ||
|-
| Mr. Bogus ||  ||  ||  ||  || || 
|-
| 1993 || Bonkers ||  ||  ||  ||  || ||
|-
| 1994 || Aladdin ||  ||  ||  ||  || ||
|-
| 1995 || Rocko's Modern Life ||  ||  ||  ||  || ||
|-
| 1995—1996 || Gargoyles ||  ||  ||  ||  || ||
|-
| rowspan="2" | 1996 || Quack Pack ||  ||  ||  ||  || ||
|-
| Jungle Cubs ||  ||  ||  ||  || ||
|-
| 1997—1998 || 101 Dalmatians: The Series ||  ||  || || || ||
|-
| 2000 || Buzz Lightyear of Star Command ||  || || || || ||
|-
| 2001—2002 || The Legend of Tarzan ||  || || || || ||
|-
| 2002—2004 || Fillmore! || || ||  || || ||
|-
| 2005 || American Dragon: Jake Long || || ||  || || ||
|-
| 2003—2006 || Lilo & Stitch: The Series ||  ||  || || || ||
|-
| 2007 || Mickey's Great Clubhouse Hunt ||  || ||  || || ||
|-
| 2006—2008 || Mickey Mouse Clubhouse ||  || || || || ||
|-
| 2008 || The Spectacular Spider-Man: Attack of the Lizard ||  ||  || || || ||
|-
| 2008—2009 || The Spectacular Spider-Man ||  ||  || ||  || ||
|-
| 2012 || Young Justice ||  || || || || Episode "Coldhearted" ||
|-
| 2010—2013 || Scooby-Doo! Mystery Incorporated ||  ||  || || || ||
|-
| 2017—2018 || Stretch Armstrong and the Flex Fighters ||  ||  ||  ||  || Also wrote the main title lyrics ||
|-
| 2019—2021 || T.O.T.S. || ||  || || || ||
|}

Film

 References 

External links

 2009 interview with Post Magazine (US) about The Spectacular Spider-Man 2009 interview with IGN about The Spectacular Spider-Man 2010 interview with If Magazine about The Spectacular Spider-Man 2017 interview with IGN about Flex Fighters 2017 interview about Flex Fighters 2018 interview with Collider about Flex Fighters''
 2018 interview with Kneel Before Pod

Year of birth missing (living people)
Living people
American animators
American animated film directors
American animated film producers
American television directors
American television producers
Place of birth missing (living people)
American television writers
American male television writers
American people of Korean descent